Edward Arturo Acevedo Cruz (born 10 December 1985) is a Dominican football former player and current manager. He played as a full-back and has represented the Dominican Republic national team. Nicknamed Beba, he currently manages Liga Dominicana de Fútbol club Atlético Vega Real.

Club career
Born in Dominican capital Santo Domingo, Acevedo played with Santo Domingo's Club Barcelona Atlético. He had a spell in Haiti with Don Bosco FC before moving to Europe along his club and national team colleague Kerbi Rodríguez and join Serbian side FK Crvenka.  In summer 2009 he moved and signed with FK Veternik a side playing in the Serbian League Vojvodina. In summer 2010 he and Kerbi moved to neighboring Bosnia and Herzegovina, more precisely to the administrative division of Republika Srpska, to play on loan with FK Modriča in the First League of the Republika Srpska.

In summer 2012 Acevedo joined FK Rudar Prijedor and played in the 2012–13 Premier League of Bosnia and Herzegovina.  In July 2013 he moved to FK Sloga Doboj, playing in the First League of the Republika Srpska, Bosnian second tier.

In summer 2014 Acevedo joined FK Tekstilac Derventa, a newly promoted club to the First League of Rep. Srpska. He made history in the club as he scored their first goal after the return to the Rep. Srpska first level.  He finished the season by making 9 league appearances and scoring one goal.

International career
Acevedo has been a member of the Dominican national team since 2008.  He was part of the team in the 2010 FIFA World Cup qualifications.

Honours
 Atlético Barcelona
Primera División de Republica Dominicana (1): 2007

 Cibao
CFU Club Championship (1): 2017

References

External sources
 
 
 2010-11 stats at BiHsoccer
 https://archive.today/20140923034531/http://fktekstilac.com/klub/prvi-tim/item/204-acevedo-cruz-edward-arturo

1985 births
Living people
Sportspeople from Santo Domingo
Dominican Republic footballers
Association football fullbacks
Club Barcelona Atlético players
FK Crvenka players
FK Veternik players
FK Modriča players
FK Rudar Prijedor players
FK Sloga Doboj players
Cibao FC players
Ligue Haïtienne players
Liga Dominicana de Fútbol players
Dominican Republic international footballers
Dominican Republic expatriate footballers
Dominican Republic expatriate sportspeople in Haiti
Expatriate footballers in Haiti
Dominican Republic expatriate sportspeople in Serbia
Expatriate footballers in Serbia
Dominican Republic expatriate sportspeople in Bosnia and Herzegovina
Expatriate footballers in Bosnia and Herzegovina
Dominican Republic football managers